Jon Ødegaard (1937–2002) was an international speedway rider from Norway.

Speedway career 
Ødegaard won the gold medal at the European Longtrack Championship in the 1970 Individual Long Track European Championship. In addition he won the Nordic Longtrack Championship four times (1969, 1970, 1974, 1975) and the Norwegian Longtrack Championship seven times (1964, 1965, 1970, 1971, 1973, 1974, 1976).

He rode in the top tier of British Speedway in 1969, riding for Swindon Robins.

References 

1937 births
2002 deaths
Norwegian speedway riders
Swindon Robins riders